U-Neek is an album by the Jamaican reggae artist Eek-A-Mouse, released in 1991. He supported the album with a North American tour. "You're the Only One I Need" was released as a single.

Production
The album was produced primarily by  Glenn "Daddy-O" Bolton, Matt Robinson, and Augustus "Gussie" Clarke. It includes a cover of Led Zeppelin's "D'yer Mak'er". "Border Patrol" is about the Immigration and Naturalization Service. 	"Rude Boys a Foreign" concerns drug trafficking. "No Problem" involves Eek-A-Mouse leading nations and solving hunger crises. "So Fine" contains a sample of "Spinning Wheel".

Critical reception

Newsday wrote that "U-Neek is full of oddities, from an apparently sincere love song ('You're the Only One I Need') to 'Gangster Chronicles', which features the Eekster rapping—or toasting—his own lyrics to part of the 'Theme from The Godfather'''." The Boston Globe determined that "the album moves faster than most reggae purists would like, but Eek-A-Mouse delights and informs while breaking new musical ground." The State'' noted that Eek-A-Mouse "can toast and rap with the best of the dance-hall sing-jays, then turn around and croon a romantic melody like a rasta Sinatra."

Track listing

Personnel 

Eek-A-Mouse –  vocals
Glenn "Daddy-O" Bolton – various instruments
Danny Lipman –  guitar, trumpet
Paul Vercesi –  alto saxophone
Danny Moynahan –  saxophone
Anthony Brewster –  trumpet
I. Timothy –  trombone
Dean Fraser –  horns, vocals
Matt Robinson  – keyboards, vocals
Robbie Lyn, Handel Tucker, Jamie Carse, Michael Hyde –  keyboards
Danny Brown, Vere Isaacs –  bass
Danny Drum, Carl Wright –  drums
Keene Carse –  drum programming, trombone
Johnny Rivers –  drum & synthesizer programming
Dave Tobocman –  programming, vocals
Kevin O'Conner, Tommy James, Debra Falconer, Mikey Bennet, J.C. Lodge, Tony Gold –  background vocals
Producers: Daddy-O, Matt Robinson, Keene Carse, Sidney Mills, Augustus "Gussie" Clarke, Johnny Rivers
Engineers: Kevin O'Conner, Butch Jones, Rob Sutton

References

1991 albums
Island Records albums